Homologation (Greek homologeo, ὁμολογέω, "to agree") is the granting of approval by an official authority. This may be a court of law, a government department, or an academic or professional body, any of which would normally work from a set of rules or standards to determine whether such approval should be given. The word may be considered very roughly synonymous with accreditation, and in fact in French and Spanish may be used with regard to academic degrees (see apostille). Certification is another possible synonym, while to homologate is the infinitive verb form.

In today's marketplace, for instance, products must often be homologated by some public agency to assure that they meet standards for such things as safety and environmental impact. A court action may also sometimes be homologated by a judicial authority before it can proceed, and the term has a precise legal meaning in the judicial codes of some countries.

The equivalent process of testing and certification for conformance to technical standards is usually known as type approval in English-language jurisdictions.

Another usage pertains to the biological sciences, where it may describe the similarities used to assign organisms to the same family or taxon, similarities they have jointly inherited from a common ancestor.

Sport

Motorsports

In motorsports a vehicle must be type approved by the sanctioning body to race in a given league, such as World Superbike, International Level Kart Racing, or other sportscar racing/touring car racing series.

Where a racing class requires that the vehicles raced be production vehicles only slightly adapted for racing, manufacturers typically produce a limited run of such vehicles for public sale so that they can legitimately race them in the class. These vehicles are commonly called "homologation specials".

Olympics
The term is also applicable in the Olympic Games, in venue certifications, prior to the start of competition. An issue was raised at Cesana Pariol—the bobsleigh, luge, and skeleton track used for the 2006 Winter Olympics in Turin—over its safety in luge. This delayed homologation of the track from January 2005 to October 2005 in order to achieve safe runs during luge competitions.

Other sports
In towed water sports, tournaments must adhere to homologation requirements set by the International Waterski & Wakeboard Federation in order to qualify as ranking. In speed climbing, in order for world, continental or national records to be recognised by the International Federation of Sport Climbing, an official homologated wall must be used, and each event must be approved through a homologation visit.

See also
 European professional qualification directives
 Homologation reactions that extend an alkyl chain by one methylene (-CH2-) unit
 NARIC
 Professional certification
 Standardization
 Type approval

References

External links

Academic homologation
 Education, recognition of diplomas and NARIC in the European Union
 Academic homologation in Spain

 Dictionary
 Certificate of Conformity

Greek words and phrases
Professional titles and certifications